The SM Europe was a range of medium/heavy trucks manufactured by the French company Saviem.

History
In 1967, Saviem launched the Europe cab (Type 860), as part of its extended collaboration with the German MAN. The new cab was also used by MAN models. In return, MAN supplied the engines fitted to the Renault models with the Europe cab (SM10, SM12, SM170, SM200, SM240, SM 260, SM280 and SM300/340 V8).

Technical details

SM 10
The gearbox was the 6-speed Saviem 330.

SM 240 and SM280
The 32-tonne GVW SM 240 was the only model sold under the Saviem badge in the UK by early 1975. The SM 280 was 36 tonnes GVW. The trucks used a 12-speed manual gearbox from ZF.

SM300 and SM340 V8
Older versions used the similar 2658 M42 version. The gearbox was a 10-speed "synchromesh" unit developed by Saviem and codenamed 350. Brakes were air-operated drums. Suspension was made of leaf springs on both axles, with telescopic dampers on front and anti-roll bar on rear. The trucks had a 38-tonne GVW as a maximum.

Notes

References and sources
 The entry incorporates text translated from the Saviem French entry.

Vehicles introduced in 1967
Saviem